Streblus brunonianus, known as the whalebone tree, is a small tree in the fig family. Commonly seen in a variety different types of rainforest, particularly by streams.

Streblus brunonianus occurs from near Milton (35° S) in the southern Illawarra district of New South Wales to Cape York Peninsula at the top of Australia. It also occurs in New Guinea and other Pacific Islands.

Other common names include the white handlewood, axe-handle wood, grey handlewood and prickly fig.

Description 

The trunk is mostly cylindrical or flanged. The bark is brown, featuring lines of vertical pustules.

The leaves are thin with a long pointed tip.  long, alternate and simple. Usually finely toothed. The underside of the leaf is hairy, the top is glossy and mid green in colour. Leaf venation is more evident on the undersurface. Unlike in other species, the lateral veins do not terminate in leaf serrations.

Flowers appear from September to May. Male flowers appear on spikes, female flowers on small clusters or spikes. The seeds are round, pale in colour and 3 mm in diameter.

Ecology 
Germination from fresh seed occurs without difficulty within seven weeks. The fruit is eaten by birds including the brown cuckoo dove, green catbird, Lewin's honeyeater, rose crowned fruit dove and topknot pigeon.

References

  (other publication details, included in citation)
 Streblus brunonianus at NSW Flora Online Retrieved on July 3, 2009

brunonianus
Rosales of Australia
Trees of Australia
Flora of Queensland
Flora of New South Wales
Flora of New Guinea